The following is a list of films produced by the Bollywood film industry based in Mumbai in 1972:

Top-grossing films 
The top ten grossing films at the Indian Box Office in
1972:

A–Z

References

External links 
 Bollywood films of 1972 at the Internet Movie Database
 Indian Film Songs from the Year 1972 – A look back at 1972 with a special focus on the Hindi film song

1972
Bollywood
Films, Bollywood